The Museum of Archaeology, founded in 1833, is a museum of the University of Durham in England.  The museum has collections ranging from the prehistoric, Ancient Greece, Roman to Medieval.

History

In 1833, the year after the University opened, an old fulling mill of the Cathedral estates was converted to house the museum. It was the second University Museum in England to open its doors to the public. By 1880 it had moved to Bishop Cosin's Almshouses on Palace Green. By 1917, the University had reduced its collections and the remainder were stored in adjacent lecture theatres. In 1931 The university appointed Eric Birley as its first lecturer in Archaeology and he added material to the collections from his excavations at Hadrian's Wall. In 1956 the University re-leased The Old Fulling Mill to house their Archaeology Department. In 1986 the museum re-opened to the public with the permanent exhibition that would remain until 2013.

Collections
As well as the collections from various periods of history, the museum also houses the results of the Durham City Survey. The Survey was undertaken by the University, in collaboration with English Heritage from 1988 to 1991 in order to summarise all known sites and finds within the greater Durham area.

Move to Palace Green

In June 2013 the Museum closed to the public to allow for a move to a larger gallery in the redeveloped Palace Green Library. This move was in part motivated by the flooding it has suffered in the preceding years and also to increase access to the displays. The new gallery Living on the Hills opened in July 2014.

External links
Museum of Archaeology

References

University museums in the United Kingdom
Archaeological museums in England
Buildings and structures of Durham University
Museums in Durham, England
Museums of ancient Rome in the United Kingdom